Filbert's Old Time is a beverage company based in Chicago, Illinois. Since 1926, it has bottled and distributed soft drinks as well as non-carbonated beverages.

History
Known best for its namesake root beer, Filbert's also produces 24 flavors of soda. The company started at the turn of the century when George Filbert and family delivered milk, ice, and coal to homes in the Bridgeport neighborhood by horse-drawn wagon. The family added root beer in 1926, when it became popular during Prohibition. It was manufactured in half barrels and supplied mostly to taverns across five nearby states. Still a family business, Filbert's is run by Ronald Filbert.

Flavors
Banana Soda
Black Cherry Soda
Blue Raspberry Soda
Blueberry Soda
Cherry Soda
Cola
Cream Soda
Diet Root Beer
Fruit Punch Soda
Ginger Ale
Ginger Beer
Grape Soda
Grapefruit Soda
Green Apple Soda
Lime Soda
Mr. Newport Lemon-Lime Soda
Orange Soda
Pineapple Soda
Peach Soda
Red Raspberry Soda
Root Beer
Sparkling Water
Strawberry Soda
Tonic
Watermelon Soda

References

External links
http://www.filbertsrootbeer.com [Official Website]
http://www.glassbottlesoda.org/bottlers/filberts.shtml GlassBottleSoda.org - [Filbert's Old Time Root Beer page]

Root beer
American soft drinks